Joel Díaz Jr. (born March 25, 1992) is an American professional boxer.

Amateur career
Díaz had an amateur record of 85 wins and 10 losses. Joel won seven amateur titles in the state of California.

Professional career
He is trained by Abel Sanchez at the Summit Gym in Big Bear Lake, California. On July 17, 2010, Joel won his pro debut via second-round K.O. over the veteran Rene Torres. This bout was held at the Agua Caliente Casino in Rancho Mirage, California.

References

External links

American boxers of Mexican descent
Boxers from California
Super-featherweight boxers
1992 births
Living people
American male boxers
People from Glendale, California
Sportspeople from San Bernardino County, California
People from Big Bear Lake, California